Results from Norwegian football (soccer) in the year 1907.

Cup

Semi-finals

|colspan="3" style="background-color:#97DEFF"|21 September 1907

Sarpsborg on walkover.

Final

Class A of local association leagues

References

External links
RSSSF Football Archive

 
Seasons in Norwegian football